This is a list of notable former consulting firms.

Former design and engineering consulting firms
 Birdsall Services Group
 Hyder Consulting
 Merz & McLellan
 Parkman Group
 Sinclair Knight Merz

Former industrial design firms
 Lunar Design

Former digital and IT consulting firms
 American Management Systems
 Cambridge Technology Partners
 American Management Systems
 Computer Sciences Corporation
 Covansys Corporation
 Diamond Management & Technology Consultants
 Hitachi Consulting
 Logica
 MarchFirst
 Mahindra Satyam
 Perot Systems
 Razorfish
 Sapient Consulting
 SapientNitro
 SapientRazorfish
 Scient
 USWeb
 Viant
 Whittman-Hart

Former cyber security consulting firms
 Mandiant

Former economics consulting firms
 Data Resources Inc.
 Wharton Econometric Forecasting Associates

Former human resource consulting firms
 Towers Perrin
 Watson Wyatt Worldwide

Former management consulting firms
 Andersen Consulting
 Arthur Andersen
 Mercer Management Consulting
Monitor
 Navigant Consulting
 Sweett Group

Former political consulting firms
 Cambridge Analytica

Former research and analysis firms
 Business International Corporation
 CNW Marketing Research
 Compete.com
 Data Resources Inc.
 EcoWin
 Global Business Network
 Micropal
 Research International
 Wharton Econometric Forecasting Associates
 Yankee Group

Former risk management consulting firms
 Towers Watson

References

List of former consulting firms 

Consulting firms
Consulting firms